Manilkara elata, also called the cow tree, is a species of plant in the family Sapotaceae. It is Endemic to the Amazon region in Brazil, where it is endangered by habitat loss.

Uses 
The edible fruit resembles small apples, and its flesh has a creamy, milk-like texture, which gave the tree its name. It is commonly sold by vendors in the Brazilian state of Pará. Indigenous peoples of the Amazon drink the milk exuded from the tree's bark.

The wood is very hard and heavy, with a normal amount of pores. It is extremely durable and highly to insect damage and rotting.

References

elata
Endangered plants
Flora of Brazil
Taxonomy articles created by Polbot